Metrioptera bicolor is a species belonging to the family Tettigoniidae  subfamily Tettigoniinae. It is found in West Europe, Central Europe and South Europe 
Their habitat is dry warm, higher growing meadows and outskirts of dry forests.

Databases currently (June 2018) disagree on the preferred placement of this and the synonym Bicolorana bicolor.  It was originally described by RA Philippi in 1830 as "Locusta bicolor".

References

Orthoptera of Europe
Tettigoniinae
Insects described in 1830